Nancy Burley (8 March 1930 – 7 January 2013) was an Australian figure skater. She represented Australia at the 1952 Winter Olympics, where she placed 14th. She and Gweneth Molony were the first ladies singles skaters to represent Australia at the Olympics.

After Burley's Olympic career she joined her previous coach Felix Kaspar in an international 'ice show'. During that time she traveled performing in ice shows in Europe and Asia.

Personal life
Burley was the mother of figure skaters Sharon and Robyn Burley.

Death
Nancy Burley died 7 January 2013.

Competitive highlights

References

External links
 Profile, Sports-reference.com; accessed 2 March 2015.
 Profile, corporate.olympics.com.au; accessed 2 March 2015.

1930 births
2013 deaths
Australian female single skaters
Olympic figure skaters of Australia
Figure skaters at the 1952 Winter Olympics
Place of birth missing
Place of death missing